The 2021 Israeli Labor Party leadership election was held on 24 January 2021 in the lead-up to the  2021 Israeli legislative election.

The candidates were Merav Michaeli, Avi Shaked, Yitzhak Taym, Gil Beilin, Navah Katz, David Landsman, and Ofer Segman. Michaeli won the leadership election with 77.5% of the vote.

Background 
Former Labor leader Amir Peretz was appointed Economy minister, while Itzik Shmuli was appointed as the head of the Labor, Social Affairs, and Social Services ministry in the Thirty-fifth government of Israel, despite Peretz promising to not join a Netanyahu-led government. Michaeli did not join the government.

Peretz announced on 23 December that he would neither run for the leadership of the party, nor run for a Knesset seat. He attempted to cancel the primaries, but the Tel Aviv District Court on 3 January 2021 ordered primaries to be held. Peretz appealed to the Supreme Court of Israel (which found in favor of Michaeli on 14 January and set the date of the election for 24 January).

Results

References

Israeli Labor Party leadership elections
2021 elections in Israel
Israeli Labor Party leadership election
January 2021 events in Asia